QuickCheck is a software library, specifically a combinator library, originally written in the programming language Haskell, designed to assist in software testing by generating test cases for test suites – an approach known as property testing.

Software
It is compatible with the compiler, Glasgow Haskell Compiler (GHC) and the interpreter, Haskell User's Gofer System (Hugs). It is free and open-source software released under a BSD-style license.

In QuickCheck, assertions are written about logical properties that a function should fulfill. Then QuickCheck attempts to generate a test case that falsifies such assertions. Once such a test case is found, QuickCheck tries to reduce it to a minimal failing subset by removing or simplifying input data that are unneeded to make the test fail.

The project began in 1999. Besides being used to test regular programs, QuickCheck is also useful for building up a functional specification, for documenting what functions should be doing, and for testing compiler implementations.

Re-implementations of QuickCheck exist for several languages:

 C
 C++ 
 Chicken 
 Clojure
 Common Lisp 
 Coq 
 D 
 Elm
 Elixir
 Erlang
 F#, and C#, Visual Basic .NET (VB.NET) 
 Factor
 Go 
 Io 
 Java
 JavaScript
 Julia
 Logtalk 
 Lua 
 Mathematica
 Objective-C 
 OCaml
 Perl 
 Prolog
 PHP
 Pony
 Python 
 R
 Racket
 Ruby 
 Rust
 Scala 
 Scheme
 Smalltalk 
 Standard ML 
 Swift
 TypeScript
 Whiley

External links
 QuickCheck on Hackage

See also
 SPIN model checker
 Property testing

References

Further reading

 
 
  
  
  

Software testing tools
Free software programmed in Haskell
Free software testing tools
Software using the BSD license